Tardu Flordun (born 25 May 1972) is a Turkish actor.

Biography 
Tardu Flordun was born on 25 May 1972 in Ankara as the son of actor Macit Flordun. He graduated in theatre from Hacettepe University after which he went to work at the Kocaeli City Theatre. In 1998, he acted in the film Leoparın Kuyruğu with Yetkin Dikinciler. He made his television debut in 2000, with a role in Evdeki Yabancı starring Berna Laçin. He then went on to act in Bir Tatlı Huzur, İki Oda Bir Sinan and Camdan Pabuçlar. In 2005, Flordun played a musician in Davetsiz Misafir where he starred with Pınar Altuğ. After appearing in the series Aşk Oyunu, he acted  in the film Bir Varmış Bir Yokmuş with Nurseli İdiz, Ceyda Düvenci ve Gülben Ergen.

In 2006, he began acting in the series Binbir Gece which ran until early 2009. He played the 'Piç Neco' (Neco the bastard) character in the crime drama film Sis ve Gece which was adapted from Ahmet Ümit's acclaimed novel. Flordun appearanced in the film O Kadın released in 2007.

Selected filmography 
Kara Melek (1996)
Mektup (1997)
Leoparın Kuyruğu (1998)
Hepsi Bir Düştü (1999)
Evdeki Yabancı (2000)
Bir Tatlı Huzur (2002)
Efsane (2002)
İki Oda Bir Sinan (2002)
Fişgittin Bey (2003)
Mühürlü Güller (2003)
Camdan Pabuçlar (2004)
Davetsiz Misafir (2005)
Aşk Oyunu (2005)
Bir Varmış Bir Yokmuş (2005)
Binbir Gece (2006)
Sis ve Gece (2006)
Parmaklıklar Ardında (2007)
O Kadın (2007)
Sözün Bittiği Yer (2007)
Bekle Beni (2010)
Mükemmel Çift (2010)
Takım (2011)
Behzat Ç.: Seni Kalbime Gömdüm (2011)
Sırat (2011)
Türkan (2011)
Tek Başımıza (2011)
Gizli Saklı (2022)

References

External links 
 

1972 births
Living people
Hacettepe University alumni
Male actors from Ankara
Turkish male film actors
Turkish male stage actors
Turkish male television actors